Franck Durbesson (born August 17, 1964, in Bondy) is a French sport shooter. He competed for France in the 1996 and 2000 Summer Olympics; he tied for seventh place in the men's skeet event in 1996 and tied for ninth place in the men's skeet event in 2000.

References

1964 births
Living people
Skeet shooters
Shooters at the 1996 Summer Olympics
Shooters at the 2000 Summer Olympics
French male sport shooters
Olympic shooters of France